Gabrovo Province ( (Oblast Gabrovo), former name Gabrovo okrug) is a small province lying at the geographical centre of Bulgaria. It is named after its main town - Gabrovo. In 2009 the total population of the area is 130,001.

Municipalities

The Gabrovo province (област, oblast) contains four municipalities (singular: община, obshtina - plural: общини, obshtini). The following table shows the names of each municipality in English and Cyrillic, the main town (in bold) or village, and the population of each as of 2009.

Demographics

The following table represents the change of the population in the province after World War II:

Total population (2011 census): 122 702 

Ethnic groups (2011 census):
Identified themselves: 115 358 persons:
Bulgarians: 106 406 (92.24%)
Turks:  6 464 (5.60%)
Romani:  1 305 (1.13%)
Others and indefinable: 1 183 (1.03%)

Religion
Religious adherence in the province according to 2001 census:

Main city
Gabrovo is the main city of the Province of Gabrovo. Long known for producing leather articles and textiles that earned the town the sobriquet of the “Manchester of Bulgaria”, Gabrovo is a charmingly laid-back provincial place.

To the Bulgarians, Gabrovo is mainly known as the home of Humour and Satire, which opened on Aprils Fool’s Day 1972 in recognition of the position traditionally occupied by the town in the Bulgarian humour. People in every country tell jokes about the supposed miserliness of a particular community, and in Bulgaria the butt of the jokes has always been Gabrovo.

A Festival of Humour and Satire takes place in May, comprising masked actors, folk music, animated cartoons and the giving of prizes. There are plenty of restaurants in the city itself but the local people will recommend that you go out of town and visit Bozhentsi and the Etara complex.

Bozhentsi and Etara

Bozhentsi is preserved as an old village museum. There is an ethnographic open-air museum, Etara, nearby. Strung out along the valley, with its clear bubbling stream and rich bird-life, the Etara complex has the look and feel of a film set, and even though it is artificial, it is nonetheless convincing and a joy to explore.

Traditionally crafts were inseparable from the charshya (bazaar), and the reconstructed bazaar of the type once common in Bulgarian towns forms the heart of the open-air museum. Throughout much of the day artisans are at work here, hammering blades, throwing pots, carving bowls and the like, and everything they make is for sale. Note that many of the artisans leave an hour or so before the complex officially closes.

Even if your interest in crafts is minimal it’s difficult not to admire the interiors of the old houses, which achieve great beauty through the skilful use of simple materials. Besides dwellings and workshops, the bazaar includes a couple of places for grabbing a quick drink, including a traditional café, and a bakery selling Turkish delight and many other sweet treats.

An hour or so walk southwest from Etara, Sokolsky Monastery perches on a crag above the village of Voditsi. During Ottoman times the monks offered succour to Bulgarian outlaws and an assembly point during the uprising against the Turks in 1876. Nowadays it is a discreet, little-visited place, with rosebushes and privet shrubs laid out in a courtyard dominated by an octagonal stone fountain.

Tourism
Places of interest in Gabrovo province include architectural reserve Bozhentsi. Hiking is widely available in the Central Balkan National Park and in the Bulgarka Nature Park, itself home to Etar Architectural-Ethnographic Complex, Dryanovo Monastery, Sokolski Monastery, Shipka Pass, and the Uzana area. For admirers of historical tourism the Shipka Freedom Memorial is a must-see.

See also
Provinces of Bulgaria
Municipalities of Bulgaria
List of cities and towns in Bulgaria
List of villages in Gabrovo Province

References

External links
 gb.government.bg

 
Provinces of Bulgaria